Phacelurus is a genus of African and Eurasian plants in the grass family.

 Species
 Phacelurus cambogiensis (Balansa) Clayton - Laos, Cambodia
 Phacelurus digitatus (Sm.) Griseb. - Albania, Bulgaria, Greece, Turkey, Lebanon, Syria
 Phacelurus franksae (J.M.Wood) Clayton - Zambia, Zimbabwe, KwaZulu-Natal
 Phacelurus gabonensis (Steud.) Clayton - tropical Africa
 Phacelurus huillensis (Rendle) Clayton - Zaïre, Tanzania, Zambia, Angola, Malawi, Mozambique, Zimbabwe
 Phacelurus latifolius (Steud.) Ohwi -- China, Korea, Japan
 Phacelurus schliebenii (Pilg.) Clayton - Zaïre, Tanzania, Zambia, Malawi
 Phacelurus speciosus (Steud.) C.E.Hubb. - Afghanistan, Pakistan, Jammu-Kashmir
 Phacelurus trichophyllus S.L.Zhong - Sichuan, Yunnan
 Phacelurus zea (C.B.Clarke) Clayton - Yunnan, Guangxi, Nepal, Sikkim, Bhutan, Assam, Arunachal Pradesh, Bangladesh, Myanmar, Thailand, Vietnam

 formerly included
see Loxodera 
 Phacelurus caespitosus - Loxodera caespitosa

References

Andropogoneae
Poaceae genera
Grasses of Africa
Grasses of Asia
Grasses of Europe